Triplophysa gundriseri is a species of stone loach from Mongolia and Tuva (Russia).

References

gundriseri
Fish of Mongolia
Fish of Russia
Taxa named by Artem Mikhailovich Prokofiev
Fish described in 2002